Ari Luotonen is a Finnish software developer and author.

He studied for M.Sc. in Tampere University of Technology, but cut his studies short with an Equivalent of B.Sc. in Computer Science. In July 1993, he moved to Geneva to work for CERN. There, he wrote a large proportion of CERN httpd, especially HTTP caching support. In addition, Luotonen contributed to the implementation of numerous CGI applications, the most famous being the WIT - W3 Interactive Talk.

In September 1994, Luotonen began working at Mosaic Communications, founded a few months earlier. Mosaic would become in two months time as of November 1994 the renamed Netscape Communications Corporation.

Works

References

Living people
1971 births
Finnish computer programmers
People associated with CERN
Finnish expatriates in Switzerland